Geophilus rhomboideus is a species of soil centipede in the family Geophilidae found in Japan. It grows up to 30 millimeters in length; the males have about 43 leg pairs, the females 49.

References

rhomboideus
Animals described in 1937
Arthropods of Japan